Kevin John Moore (born 30 January 1956) is an English retired professional footballer, who played as a winger.

After making his debut in 1973 aged 17 Moore made 38 English Football League appearances for Blackpool between 1973 and 1977, scoring three goals in the process, followed by a loan spell at Bury, Moore joined Newport County in 1978. Between 1978 and 1983 Moore made 148 appearances for Newport, scoring fourteen goals during the most successful period in the club's long history. Moore was part of the team that won promotion and the Welsh Cup, and in the subsequent season reached the quarter-final of the 1981 European Cup Winners Cup losing 1 0 to Carl Zeis Jena at Somerton Park where Newport dominated the game.  Moore scored 2 goals in Europe 1 in each home game against Belfast Crusaders and Hauger of Norway.

In 1983, he had a brief loan spell at Swindon Town, Moore was inducted into the Newport County Hall of Fame in 2009. After retiring Moore returned to Blackpool and has been MD of Thistleton Lodge Care Home since 1986. 
Now spends a lot of his time in the USA being a member of Lake Nona Golf and Country Club home to several European Ryder Cup team members.

References

External links
Neil Brown

1956 births
Living people
Sportspeople from Blackpool
English footballers
Blackpool F.C. players
Bury F.C. players
Newport County A.F.C. players
Swindon Town F.C. players
Swansea City A.F.C. players
English Football League players
Association football wingers